

Incumbents
President:
 until April 20: Duan Qirui 
 April 20 – May 13: Hu Weide
 May 13 – June 22: Yan Huiqing
 June 22 – October 1: Du Xigui
 starting October 1: Koo Vi-kyuin
Premier: 
 until March 4: Xu Shiying
 March 4 – April 20: Jia Deyao 
 April 20 – May 13: Hu Weide
 May 13 – June 22: Yan Huiqing
 June 22 – October 1: Du Xigui
 starting October 1: Wellington Koo

Events
March 12 – Japanese warship bombards the Taku Forts, killing several Guominjun troops guarding the forts. Guominjun troops fired back in retaliation and drive the warship out of the Tanggu harbor.
March 16 – Ambassadors representing eight countries that were signatory nations to the Boxer Protocol send an ultimatum to the Beiyang Government under Duan Qirui, demanding that the Duan government destroy all defense establishments on the Taku Forts.
March 18 – March 18 Massacre in Beijing.
April – Guominjun ousts Duan Qirui's government and releases the deposed ex-president Cao Kun to appease the Zhili clique. Conclusion of Anti-Fengtian War.
June – Chiang Kai-shek became the Commander-in-Chief of the National Revolutionary Army
July 9 – KMT launches Northern Expedition.
October – Conclusion of the Canton-Hong Kong strike.
October 16 – Explosion of ammunition on the Chinese troopship Kuang Yuang, near Kiukiang, China

Births
August 11 – John Gokongwei, Chinese-Filipino billionaire businessman and philanthropist (died 2019)
August 17 – Jiang Zemin, politician (died 2022)
September 23 – Chen Wenxin, biologist (died 2021)

Deaths
April 26 – Shao Piaoping
April 29 – Ching Chang

See also
Warlord Era

References

 
1920s in China